Eddy Leppens (born 3 December 1969 in Lommel, Belgium) is a Belgian professional three cushion billiards player.

Private life 
Leppens was born in the flanders city of Lommel where he also spend his childhood. He is married to Andrea Ospino and together they have three children named Lindsey, Maria Fernanda and Romy. In 2005 he opened his own billiard shop Verhoeven Eddy Leppens.

Career

Early years 
His father was an active billiards player. At eighteen, Eddy Leppens was playing of the Honour Division in straight rail, four years later in all six disciplines of carom billiards: straight rail, balkline (47/2, 47/1 and 71/2), one-cushion, and three-cushion billiards. In 1993, Leppens won the Belgian Cup in three cushion, his preferred discipline.

2000–2010 
In 2002, in three cushion billiards, he had his best single average of 5.000 with 50 points in 10 innings. A year later, he established his high run of 25. The following year, he set a new world record with a team average of 2.139 together with his teammates Frédéric Caudron, Raymond Burgman and Johan Loncelle.

In 2010 his team won the club world championship in three cushion.

2012/13 season
At the  UMB World Three-cushion Championship in early September in Porto Leppens was able to win his first group match against German Markus Dömer  40-14, but lost his second match against Lütfi Çenet from Turkey  34-40. He finished second in his group but did not advance as only the first-place finisher moved on.

One month later, at the ANAG Billiard Cup, a Triathlon Invitation Tournament in Czech Olomouc, Leppens would beat Raul Cuenca from Spain in the final, 2-1. The tournament was held in the disciplines balkline, one-cushion and three-cushion. While he was losing balkline 24-100 to Cuenca, he won his games in one-cushion 50-27 and three-cushion 15-8. During the group games he beat the 2012 Triathlon-World Champion, Wolfgang Zenker from Germany, who had finished third in the 2011 tournament.

Together with Frédéric Caudron, Leppens plays for the Belgian club BC De Goeie Queue in the major league.

Achievements 
 Belgian Champion Juniors: 1988 (Three-Cushion), 1990 (Free Game), 1991 (Free Game)
 Belgian Champion: 1991 (Free Game and Balkline 71/2), 1993 (Balkline 47/1 and One-Cushion),1994 (One-Cushion), 1995 (Free Game and One-Cushion), 2000 (Free Game)
 Semi Team World Champion: 1992 (Triathlon)
 Team World Champion: 1993 (Triathlon)
 Superprestige: 2004 (Three-Cushion)
 Three Cushion World Championship: 2. Place:  2010; 3. Place:  2005, 2009
 One Cushion World Championship: 3. Place:  2007
 Tree Cushion World Cup: 3. Place:  2011
 One Cushion European Championship: 3. Place:  2000, 2006
 ANAG Billiard Cup: 2012 (Triathlon)

References

External links 
 Official Homepage
 Leppens career results on Kozoom.com

Belgian carom billiards players
1969 births
Living people
People from Lommel
Sportspeople from Limburg (Belgium)